Hardiljeet Singh Sidhu was an Indian writer.

Biography
Lali was born in a landlord family belonging to village Fatehgarh near Lehragaga in Sangrur district in Punjab. He was married to Satwant Kaur in 1967 and had two sons and a daughter. Lali taught at Linguistics department in Punjabi University, Patiala before he retired. Though he never got published any book of his own, he was known to be a virtual treasure trove of world of art and literature. He carried on the oral tradition imparting a great deal of knowledge to those around him.

Noted Panjabi poet Navtej Bharati wrote a poetry book Lālī (ਲਾਲੀ) named after him and dedicated to him.

Death
Lali died on 28 December 2014 at Patiala.

References

Linguists from India
Scholars from Punjab, India
Academic staff of Punjabi University
1932 births
People from Sangrur district
2014 deaths